The 1860 New Hampshire gubernatorial election was held on March 13, 1860.

Incumbent Republican Governor Ichabod Goodwin defeated Democratic nominee Asa P. Cate in a re-match of the previous year's election.

General election

Candidates
Asa P. Cate, Democratic, attorney, former President of the New Hampshire Senate, Democratic nominee for Governor in 1858 and 1859
Ichabod Goodwin, Republican, incumbent Governor

Results

Notes

References

1860
New Hampshire
Gubernatorial